Gustavo Adolfo Rodríguez Garcés (born 12 October 1998), known as Gustavo Rodríguez, is a Mexican football player who currently plays for Franklin Pierce University men's soccer team.

External links

Living people
1998 births
Mexican footballers
Association football defenders
Club Universidad Nacional footballers
Atlético San Luis footballers
Liga MX players
Ascenso MX players
Liga Premier de México players
Tercera División de México players
Footballers from Veracruz
People from Veracruz (city)